Shamil Khan (also known as Shamyl; born March 1978 in Islamabad) is a Pakistani film and television actor known for his role in the Punjabi language film Larki Punjaban. He also appears in the Hum TV serial Sadqay Tumhare.

Shamil Khan was appointed as a CLF Goodwill Ambassador by the Children's Literature Festival on July 30, 2019.

Filmography

Films

Television

References

External links 
 

1978 births
Living people
People from Islamabad
Pakistani male film actors
Punjabi people